Pedro Pardo de Cela Rodriguez de Aguiar e Ribadeneyra (died October 3, 1483) was a fifteenth century Marshal of Galicia, son of Joam Nunes Pardo, senhor da Torre Cela and Dona Teresa Rodriguez de Aguiar.

He was beheaded on October 3, 1483, along with his son Peter, in front of the cathedral of Mondoñedo by order of the Catholic Monarchs.

Biography
Pedro Pardo de Cela was a feudal lord. He was a supporter of Joanna la Beltraneja of Portugal. The death of her father, Henry IV of Castile was followed by new kings of Castile, Isabella I of Castile and her husband, Ferdinand II of Aragon.

Pardo was married to the daughter of the first Earl of Lemos, Isabel Perez Osorio. The latter came with his uncle, Pedro Enríquez, bishop of Mondoñedo, where Pardo de Cela was merino representing the House of Lemos. Enriquez gave her a wedding dowry in 1441 including the bishopric's revenues, except those needed for their livelihood, made up mostly of castles and fortresses, counting the reconstructed castle Frouxeira.

In 1445, he moved to Viveiro, where he became mayor in 1474 with the title of Marshal. He  bought the "casa do Carballo of Galdo". In 1476 he was removed from the hall by the Catholic Monarchs. In 1478 he was expelled from Vivero and the Catholic Monarchs wrote to the municipalities of Santa Marta de Ortigueira and Mondoñedo so they would not allow his entry. He asked for a letter of "safe harbor" from the Kings and took refuge in Castle Frouxeira. With "the other two Pedros", Pedro de Bolaño and Pedro de Miranda, he defeated the Spanish troops, commanded by Fernando Cunha, son of the Count of Buendia, and Luis de Mudarra, who came to Galicia in September 1480 to "pacify" the Kingdom.

Pardo's will was found in 2013 by historian Eduardo Pardo de Guevara (his descendant). It revealed that many of the stories told about him were untrue.

References

External links 
 La verdad de Pardo de Cela ABC.es 
 El Mariscal Pero Pardo de Cela Britonia 
 Pedro Pardo de Cela, el mariscal de Mondoñedo Espana Fasciente 

Galician nobility
Date of birth unknown
1483 deaths
Executed Spanish people
Year of birth unknown
1425 births
15th-century Castilians